Mataeomera mesotaenia is a species of moth of the family Erebidae first described by Turner in 1929. It is found in Australia.

References

Boletobiinae